Moses Tenney, Jr. (June 18, 1808 – January 7, 1903) was an American politician who served as Treasurer of Massachusetts.

Early life
Tenney was born in Newbury, Massachusetts to Moses and Hannah (Whitaker) Tenney,

Family life
Tenney married Mary Ann Northend on April 6, 1831, they had five children, she died on May 18, 1888. They lived in Georgetown, Massachusetts.

Massachusetts State Senate
Tenney was elected to the Massachusetts Senate for the Essex District in 1854, serving for the year 1855, on the committee of railroads and canals.

State treasurer
Tenney was elected state treasurer in 1855, and subsequently re elected to four more one year terms.

Death
Tenney died on January 7, 1903.

Bibliography
 Massachusetts General Court "Acts and Resolves Passed by the General Court of Massachusetts in the Year 1855", page 1056 (1855).
 Tenney, Martha Jane, The Tenney Family, or, the Descendants of Thomas Tenney, of Rowley, Massachusetts, 1638–1890, page 210 (1891).
 Tenney, Martha Jane, The Tenney Family, or, the Descendants of Thomas Tenney, of Rowley, Massachusetts, 1638–1890, pages 350–351(1904).

References

People from Newbury, Massachusetts
People from Georgetown, Massachusetts
1808 births
1903 deaths
State treasurers of Massachusetts
Massachusetts state senators
19th-century American politicians